Louis Calebout (27 July 1928 – 30 August 2010) was a Belgian boxer. He competed in the men's bantamweight event at the 1948 Summer Olympics. At the 1948 Summer Olympics, he lost his first bout to Juan Venegas of Puerto Rico in the Round of 32.

References

External links
 

1928 births
2010 deaths
Belgian male boxers
Olympic boxers of Belgium
Boxers at the 1948 Summer Olympics
Sportspeople from Bruges
Bantamweight boxers
20th-century Belgian people